Bahmanabad (also Romanized as Bahmanābād) is a village in Mazinan Rural District, Central District, Davarzan County, Razavi Khorasan Province, Iran. At the 2006 census, its population was 238, divided between 77 families.

See also 

 List of cities, towns and villages in Razavi Khorasan Province

References 

Populated places in Davarzan County